Jean-Louis Michel (born 1945) is a French oceanographer and engineer.

He discovered subsea intervention in 1969 with the French Navy as an officer at the Groupe des Bathyscaphes headed by Captain Georges Houot.

Robert Ballard mentions in an interview with the Forbes that Jean-Louis Michel rarely gets enough credit for co-discovering the Titanic.

References

Living people
French oceanographers
French naval architects
RMS Titanic
1945 births